The Riverfront Times (RFT) is a free progressive weekly newspaper in St. Louis, in the U.S. state of Missouri, that consists of local politics, music, arts, and dining news in the print edition, and daily updates to blogs and photo galleries on its website.  the Riverfront Times has an ABC-audited weekly circulation of 81,276 copies.

History
The paper was founded in 1977 by Ray Hartmann who, along with co-owner Mark Vittert, sold the newspaper in 1998 to New Times Media (later known, following a 2006 merger, as Village Voice Media). In September 2012, Village Voice Media executives Scott Tobias, Christine Brennan and Jeff Mars agreed to purchase Village Voice Media's papers and associated web properties from its founders and formed Voice Media Group. In 2015, Euclid Media Group acquired the Times  from Voice Media Group.

The paper has received more than three dozen awards from the Missouri Press Association, along with the group's Gold Cup. The paper and website also currently feature a weekly syndicated column by relationship and sex advice writer Dan Savage. In the past, the paper carried Chuck Sheppard's News of the Weird column.

In June 2019, editor-in-chief Sarah Fenske announced her departure after being selected to host St. Louis on the Air on St. Louis Public Radio. News editor Doyle Murphy was selected as interim editor-in-chief. Murphy served as editor-in-chief until he announced in the February 9, 2022, edition that he would be leaving the paper to work for St. Louis Public Radio. Ben Westhoff, the executive editor of Euclid Media Group, served as interim editor-in-chief following Murphy's resignation, but announced on February 24, 2022, that Rosalind Early, who was then serving as deputy managing editor for Washington Magazine at Washington University in St. Louis, would be the paper's next editor in chief, starting in March.

See also

Wm. Stage, RFT columnist
St. Louis Beacon
Suburban Journals
St. Louis Post-Dispatch

References

External links
RFT website

1998 mergers and acquisitions
2012 mergers and acquisitions
2015 mergers and acquisitions
1977 establishments in Missouri
Alternative weekly newspapers published in the United States
Newspapers published in St. Louis
Newspapers established in 1977